Chuck is a masculine given name.

Chuck may also refer to:

Computers and technology
 ChucK, a programming language for computer music
 Chuck (engineering), a device for holding tools or workpieces
 Chuck, a common name for the BSD Daemon mascot

Entertainment
 Chuck (Sum 41 album), 2004
 Chuck (Chuck Berry album), 2017
 Chuck (TV series), an American action-comedy
 Chuck (film), a 2016 American biographical sports drama

Radio
 Chuck FM, branding for WAVF, Charleston, South Carolina
 Chuck FM, branding for W258CB, Greenville, South Carolina
 Chuck FM, former branding for WFZZ, Green Bay, Wisconsin

Other uses
 Chuck steak, a cut of beef
 chuck, meaning to throw.
 Chuck Taylor All-Stars, a shoe brand often known as "Chucks"
 Chuck or woodchuck, vernacular names of the groundhog
 Abbreviation for nunchaku, a kind of martial arts weapon